The following radio stations broadcast on AM frequency 1510 kHz: 1510 AM is a North American (U.S.) clear-channel frequency. WLAC in Nashville, Tennessee, is the dominant Class A station on 1510 AM.  KGA Spokane had been a Class A station, before it reduced its nighttime power and downgraded to Class B in 2008.

Argentina
 LRI253 in Suardi, Santa Fe
 LV21 in Villa Dolores, Córdoba

Mexico
 XEPBGR-AM in Guadalajara, Jalisco
 XEQI-AM in Monterrey, Nuevo León

United States
Stations in bold are clear-channel stations.

References

Lists of radio stations by frequency